Salt Creek is an unincorporated community and a census-designated place (CDP) located in and governed by Pueblo County, Colorado, United States. The CDP is a part of the Pueblo, CO Metropolitan Statistical Area. The population of the Salt Creek CDP was 507 at the United States Census 2020. The Pueblo post office  serves the area.

Geography
The neighborhood is also called Barrio Salado.

Demographics

See also

Outline of Colorado
Index of Colorado-related articles
State of Colorado
Colorado cities and towns
Colorado census designated places
Colorado counties
Pueblo County, Colorado
Colorado metropolitan areas
Front Range Urban Corridor
South Central Colorado Urban Area
Pueblo, CO Metropolitan Statistical Area

References

External links

Salt Creek @ UncoverColorado.com
Salt Creek Neighborhood Memory Project
Pueblo County website

Census-designated places in Pueblo County, Colorado
Census-designated places in Colorado